TV Times is a British television listings magazine published by Future plc. It was originally published by Independent Television Publications, owned by the participating ITV companies. The magazine was acquired by IPC Media in 1989, which became Time Inc. UK in 2014.

Prior to 28 February 1991, it was the only source of seven-day listings for ITV and later, Channel 4 (includes S4C in Wales). The magazine was first published in 1955, but did not circulate nationally until 1968 as some (usually smaller) regional stations opted to produce their own listings publications. Until the market was deregulated, its nearest rival was Radio Times – owned then by the BBC and at the time the only source of weekly BBC television and radio schedules. However the two magazines were very different in character, and viewers wanting the full listings for the coming week were required to purchase both publications.

It also used the branding for several broadcast spin-offs on ITV, often include the Miss TV Times and The TV Times Awards during the 1970s and 1980s.

Publication
TV Times was launched on 22 September 1955, with the start of transmissions of the first ITV station, Associated-Rediffusion. Initially, the magazine was published only in the London area, carrying listings for Associated-Rediffusion (Rediffusion, London from 1964) on weekdays and ATV at weekends, but regional editions began to appear covering those ITV regional companies which did not opt to establish their own listings magazines. TV Times became a national magazine (except for the Channel Islands) from 21 September 1968.

The magazine was branded as TV Times Magazine from 3 October 1981 until 6 October 1984, the premise being it contained more than simply television listings. From November 1982 onwards, it carried listings for Channel 4 and its Welsh equivalent, S4C. On 7 October 1989, the programme schedule pages were finally printed in full colour for the first time. When the television listings were deregulated on 1 March 1991, TV Times began carrying listings for the BBC's television channels which, up to that point, had only been printed in the BBC's official listings magazine, Radio Times. On 11 February 2006, the magazine was refreshed for a more modern look including the double-page highlights of programmes on all channels as well as radio and kids' television listings were scrapped, increasing the publication's emphasis on big-star interviews and soaps.

On 15 March 2022, the television listings were given a refreshed layout which is similar to Radio Times, TV & Satellite Week and What's on TV. The changes included a return of radio schedules to the magazine after a 16-year absence.

TV Times Awards
The awards were held annually to celebrate best in British television as nominations and winners are entirely chosen by its readers.

Regional editions
Until 21 September 1968, several of the regional ITV companies produced their own listings magazines:

During the late 1950s until the early 1980s, TV Times suffered frequent printing disputes that often meant emergency or special combined editions.

On 1 March 1991, TV Times published BBC1 and BBC2 programme listings for the first time, which also mirrored the 11 regional editions generally referred to by the ITV company's name, rather than geographical area:

Every local ITV station originally had its own version, but since 2006 as they have been only four editions:

TV World
From 1956 to 1964, the Midlands originally had their own edition of TV Times listing ATV and ABC programmes. A separate listings magazine called TV World was published from 27 September 1964, with the innovative idea of splitting itself 50:50 with a second cover in the middle allowing for the magazine to be folded over to create both a weekend and a weekday section from one publication. TV Times went national (except for the Channel Islands) from 21 September 1968.

Channel Viewer / CTV Times
Channel Television published its own listings magazine Channel Viewer on 1 September 1962, followed by a relaunch as Channel Television Times in 1971 and then later shortened to CTV Times until 25 October 1991 as it was feared that the company might cease trading without the revenue from its own magazine.

Sbec
S4C launched its own pull-out weekly listings supplement magazine Sbec on 1 November 1982, distributed free with the Wales edition of TV Times. It contained full details of schedules in both Welsh and English. Channel 4's programmes were also included.

See also
 Look-in

References

External links
 TV Times website
 TV Times Index Project (TVTip) – Database of TV Times listings 1955 – 1985

Listings magazines
1955 establishments in the United Kingdom
Magazines established in 1955
Magazines published in London
Television magazines published in the United Kingdom
Weekly magazines published in the United Kingdom